H. Rajesh Prasad (1 June 1967 - 28 July 2022) was an Indian politician who served as the Governor of Lakshadweep from 7 November 2012 to 22 October 2015.

Education
Prasad has completed his graduation in commerce stream and further completed Master of Business Administration from Indian Institute of Management, Bangalore.

Prasad died of COVID-19 in 2022 at the age of 55.

References

1967 births
2022 deaths
Indian Administrative Service officers
Administrators of Lakshadweep
Deaths from the COVID-19 pandemic in India